Dlisted is a celebrity gossip blog written by Michael K. The site originally started on January 23, 2005 as the D-List, but changed its name to Dlisted due to copyright issues with Kathy Griffin: My Life on the D-List.

Overview 
Dlisted focuses on celebrity gossip and is known for covering the exploits of particular celebrities in detail, including Britney Spears, Madonna, Angelina Jolie, Lady Gaga, Gwyneth Paltrow, Lindsay Lohan's mother Dina Lohan, UK glamour model Katie Price, media personality Phoebe Price, and former Playboy model Shauna Sand. The site has bestowed nicknames on several of its subjects, including "Prince Hot Ginge" for Prince Harry, and "Rojo Caliente" for Christine Marinoni, the wife of Cynthia Nixon.  

Dlisted also includes regular features, including "Hot Slut of the Day" (which culminates in a vote for "Hot Slut of the Year") and a "Caption This" contest. Michael K's style and humor have been described as "snarky" and "unforgiving," which fit the blog's tagline: "Be Very Afraid."

"Michael K" is Michael Kuroiwa. Kuroiwa was initially the only writer, and still writes at least one post a day, along with other site contributors.  Initially, Koroiwa launched the blog semi-anonymously, leaving out his last name because he held a full-time job at an Internet company and performed much of his blogging from the office. Due to the success of the website, he was able to make enough money through advertising that he quit his job and began working on the site full-time.  The blog had more than a million hits a day in 2007.

Dlisted: The Podcast launched in August 2018 and is co-hosted by Kuroiwa and site contributor Allison Davey.

Background 
In a October 2008 interview with SheWired.com, Kuroiwa spoke about the creation of Dlisted. "I worked at a job for M, which is like a Manhunt type thing. I wrote the letters and stuff and I kind of just started writing there on my down time. At lunch when I had nothing to do I would write about stuff. I didn’t think it would become anything. It was just stupid fun and then, it was about six months to a year later when I realized there were people reading it and that's when I had to decide where I was going to go with it."

In the same interview with SheWired.com, Kuroiwa was asked to name the reason for the blog's success. He said, "I don't know. I never promoted it. I never advertised. That was never my goal. I think it was that my friends would read it and they'd send it to their friends. I used to post personal pictures and stuff because I saw it as both a personal blog and a blog about just things that I like. So that's when I decided I wasn't going to make it personal. I was just going to cover this and focus on that."

References

External links 
Dlisted.com
The Seattle Times: Shooting the snark with the king of Dlisted By Francine Ruley

Infotainment
American gossip columnists
American entertainment news websites
Gossip blogs
Internet properties established in 2005